Daxue Mountain (大雪山, Daxue Shan) is a high mountain in Yongde County, Yunnan, China. It is located west of China National Highway 323, about 50 km to the northwest of Lincang.

With a height of 3,500 m and a prominence of 2,041 m, the Daxue Shan is the most prominent peak of the Indo-Malayan System in Southeast Asia.

This mountain should not be confused with another mountain by the same name in Qinghai.

See also
List of mountains in China
List of Ultras of Southeast Asia
List of peaks by prominence

References

External links
Google Books, The Physical Geography of Southeast Asia
List of Mountains in Yunnan

Mountains of Yunnan
Geography of Lincang